Edmond Deman (1857–1918) was a publisher, antiquarian bookseller and prints dealer in fin-de-siècle Brussels.

Life
Deman was born in Brussels on 26 March 1857. He studied at the Catholic University of Leuven, where he became friends with Émile Verhaeren and edited a student newspaper together with members of the circle that went on to found La Jeune Belgique. In 1880 he married Constance  Horwath and together they set up as antiquarian bookdealers in Brussels.

From 1888 onwards, Deman used a logo designed for him by Fernand Khnopff in his catalogues. He also published a relatively small number of bibliophile editions, mainly of leading poets with illustrations by leading artists, particularly Émile Verhaeren and Théo van Rysselberghe.

During the First World War he took refuge in his holiday home at Le Lavandou. He died there on 19 February 1918.

Publications

1888
 Émile Verhaeren, Les soirs, with a frontispiece by Odilon Redon and four vignettes by Fernand Khnopff, printed by Veuve  Monnom
 Edgar Allan Poe, Poèmes, translated by Stephane Mallarmé
 Émile Verhaeren, Les débâcles

1890
 Iwan Gilkin, La Damnation de l'artiste

1891
 Jules Destrée, L'oeuvre lithographique de Odilon Redon
 Stephane Mallarmé, Pages
 Émile Verhaeren, Les flambeaux noirs

1892
 Iwan Gilkin, Ténèbres

1893
 Émile Verhaeren, Les campagnes hallucinées

1894
 Maurice Maeterlinck, Alladine et Palomides, Interieur, et La mort de Tintagiles: trois petits drames pour marionnettes

1895
 Émile Verhaeren, Les villes tentaculaires

1896
 Émile Verhaeren, Les heures claires

1897
 Gustave Kahn, Limbes de lumières, illustrated by Georges Lemmen
 Camille Lemonnier, Alphonse Wauters, and Armand Heins, Le Palais de la ville de Bruxelles à l'Exposition universelle de 1897

1898
 Léon Bloy, Mendiant ingrat
 Émile Verhaeren, Les aubes

1899
 Stephane Mallarmé, Poésies
 Émile Verhaeren, Les visages de la vie
 Villiers de l'Isle-Adam, Histoires souveraines, with ornaments by Théo van Rysselberghe

1900
 Émile Verhaeren, Le cloître
 Émile Verhaeren, Petites légendes

1901
 Eugène Demolder, Constantin Meunier
 Eugène Demolder, Trois contemporains: Henri de Brakeleer, Constantin Meunier, Félicien Rops

1904
 Émile Verhaeren, Les Tendresses premières, illustrated by Théo van Rysselberghe

1905
 Émile Verhaeren, Les heures d'après-midi

1907
 Jules Barbey d'Aurevilly, Le rideau cramoisi, illustrated by Armand Rassenfosse

1908
 Fernand Crommelynck, Le sculpteur de masques

1912
 Thomas Braun, Fumée d'Ardenne, with a cover by Georges Lemmen

Further reading
 Adrienne and Luc Fontainas, Edmond Deman Éditeur (1857-1918): Art et édition au tournant du siècle (Brussels, Labor, 1997)

References

1857 births
1918 deaths
Bibliophiles
Belgian publishers (people)
Catholic University of Leuven (1834–1968) alumni